Kenneth George "Buck" Davies (August 10, 1922 – November 11, 2004) was a Canadian ice hockey player, who played center with the New York Rangers in a 1948 playoff game, his only NHL game.

Davies was born in Bowmanville, Ontario. Most of his career in the American Hockey League was with the Providence Reds.

See also
List of players who played only one game in the NHL

References

External links

1922 births
2004 deaths
Buffalo Bisons (AHL) players
Canadian ice hockey centres
Cleveland Barons (1937–1973) players
Ice hockey people from Ontario
Jersey Larks players
New Haven Ramblers players
New York Rangers players
Philadelphia Ramblers players
Providence Reds players
Sportspeople from Clarington
20th-century Canadian people